Michèle Gérard (she wrote under the name Michèle Fabien) (April 2, 1945 – September 10, 1999) was a Belgian writer and playwright.

The daughter of Albert S. Gérard, a professor of literature, she was born in Genk. She received a PhD from the University of Liège. With Marc Liebens, she helped create the Ensemble Théâtral Mobile, a Belgian theatre company, and was one its resident writers from 1974.

Fabien suffered a cerebral hemorrhage and died a few days later at the age of 54 in Normandy.

Original works 
 Jocaste (1981)
 Sara Z (1982)
 Notre Sade (1985)
 Tausk (1987)
 Adget et Bérénice (1989)
 Claire Lacombe (1989)
 Berty.Albrecht (1989)
 Déjanire (1995)
 Charlotte (1999)

Translated and/or adapted works 
 Maison de poupée (Henrik Ibsen) (1975)
 Les Bons Offices (Pierre Mertens) (1980)
 Oui (Thomas Bernhard) (1981)
 Aurelia Steiner (Marguerite Duras) (1982)
 Affabulazione (Pier Paolo Pasolini) (1988)
 Pylade (Pier Paolo Pasolini) (1990)
 Calderon (Pier Paolo Pasolini) (1990)
 Amphitryon (Plautus) (1992)
 Cassandre (Christa Wolf) (1995)
 Une paix royale (Pierre Mertens) (1997)
 Stabat mater (Antonio Tarantino) (1998)
 Œdipe sur la route (Henry Bauchau) (1999)

References 

1945 births
1999 deaths
University of Liège alumni
People from Genk
20th-century Belgian writers
20th-century Belgian dramatists and playwrights
Belgian male dramatists and playwrights
20th-century Belgian women writers
Belgian women dramatists and playwrights
Pseudonymous women writers
20th-century pseudonymous writers